Shaikh Ayaz SI born Mubarak Ali Shaikh  (March 1923 – 28 December 1997) was Sindhi language poet, prose writer and former Vice Chancellor of University of Sindh. He is counted as one of the prominent and great Sindhi poet of Pakistan in general and Sindh in particular. The author of more than 50 books on poetry, biographies, plays and short stories in both Sindhi and Urdu languages. His translations of Shah Jo Risalo, which was written by the 18th-century Sufi poet Shah Abdul Latif Bhittai, from Sindhi to Urdu language established him as an authority in his domain.

He received Sitara-i-Imtiaz for his literary works and is regarded as a "revolutionary and romantic poet".

In 2018, a university, Shaikh Ayaz University, was established and was named after him.

Early life
Shaikh Ayaz was born as Mubarak Ali on 2 March 1923 in Shikarpur, Sindh. He was a lawyer but he also served as the vice-chancellor of Sindh University. Ayaz married Iqbal Begum, who was also a Sindhi poet. In his book Shah Jo Risalo he has discussed in details about his struggle and always mentioned that in the Islamic country like Pakistan the only true friend he found was Deewan Parmanand Gangwani whom he considers to be the bravest person he met in his life and always consider Deewan Gangwani the finest person one would have as a friend. Parmanand Gangwani died in 1983. He died on 28 December 1997 in Karachi, Sindh after suffering from cardiac-arrest - leaving behind two sons and a daughter.

Literary career

Ayaz is one of the major voices in twentieth-century poetry. His literary career spanned almost six decades and covered a wide range of poetry and prose forms, ranging from the traditional bait, wa'i,nazm,"azad nazm" and ghazal to plays in verse. He wrote short stories, Operas, essays, poetry, travelogues, diaries, an autobiography and the translation of Shah Jo Risalo in Urdu. He also wrote poetry in Urdu which is spread to two books, Booye Gul, Nala-i-dil" and Neel Kanth Aur Neem Ke Pate. His first book of poetry was in Urdu named Boi gul, Nalai dil and his first book of poetry in Sindhi was, " Bhounr Bhire Akas"

Romantic poetry
Ayaz has contributed new work contribution to the sindhi literature. before him, the ancient sindhi poets writes on abstract or spiritual love which is not physical Love; Platonic Love. Due to the modern effect of the world, he considered sex; Physical Love as more attractive in the real Love.

Awards
 Sitara-i-Imtiaz
 Sitare Jurat
Latif Award

Bibliography
'In Sindhi poetryڀنور ڀري آڪاس'ڪلھي پاتم ڪينرو ڪي جي ٻيجل ٻوليووڄون وسڻ آيونڪپر ٿو ڪن ڪريلڙيون سج لڪن مپتڻ ٿو پور ڪريٽڪرا ٽڪرا صليب جاپن ڇڻ پڄاڻان واٽون ڦلن ڇانئيونچنڊ چنبيلي ولرڻ تي رم جھمراج گھاٽ تي چنڊڀڳت سنگھ کي ڦاھي بڙ جي ڇانو اڳي کان گھاٽياڪن نيرا ڦلياسُر نارائڻ شياماُڀر چنڊ پس پرينھينئڙو ڏاڙھون گل جيئنڪتين ڪر موڙيا جڏھنننڊ وليونچنڊ ڳليونسر لوھيڙا ڳڀاسورج مکي سانجھجر ڏيئا جھمڪنھرڻ اکي ڪيڏانھنگھاٽ مٿان گھنگھور گھٽاسانجھي سمنڊ سپونڪونجون ڪرڪن روھ تي وڏا وڻ وڻڪار جاتون ڇپر تون ڇانءIn Sindhi proseسفيد وحشيپنھل کان پو۽بقول ايازجي ڪاڪ ڪڪوريا ڪاپڙيساھيوال جيل ڊائريخط انٽرويو تقريرونڪراچي جا ڏينھن ۽ راتيونڪٿي نه ڀڃبو ٿڪ مسافرIn Urdu

 Booye Gul Nala-i-dil Neel Kanth Aur Neem Ke Pate''

See also

 Sindhi people
 Sindhi poetry
 Sindhi literature
 List of Sindhi language poets
 Shah Abdul Latif Bhittai
 Shikarpur, Pakistan
 Sindhi Shaikh

References

External links
Shikarpur Sindh's official website
Welcome

Pakistani poets
Sindhi-language poets
Sindhi people
1923 births
1997 deaths
20th-century poets
Modernist writers
Postmodern writers
Progressive Writers' Movement
Urdu-language writers
20th-century Pakistani short story writers
20th-century Pakistani male writers
20th-century translators
People from Shikarpur District